Tohpati Ario Hutomo (born 25 July 1971) is an Indonesian jazz guitarist and songwriter. He is known as one of the most famous jazz guitarists in Indonesia. He has collaborated with many Indonesian musicians such as Glenn Fredly, Indro, Arie Ayunir and Shakila. Many of his work has traditional culture elements as he always try to combine both modern and traditional Indonesian music on his albums. The influence came from many different international jazz guitarists, but the most significant influence came from Pat Metheny.

Music career

Earlier experiences
In his early age, Tohpati was already interested in becoming a musician and often played on many shows around Jakarta, although it was not as a professional career. As a result of his effort, he had won the title "Best Guitarist" at a band festival in Jakarta when he was 14 years old. Four years after that, in 1989, he won another notable award of the best guitarist in Java, also was given at a band festival. This award then contributed a major part in Tohpati's music experience as his name began to be noticed because in the same year, he won another best guitarist title at a "Yamaha Band Explosion" show, which was a national show.

Professional career
After winning a series of awards, Tohpati decided to begin his professional career. His professional career began in 1993 when he joined a band called Simak Dialog with Riza Arshad, Arie Ayunir and Indro. Indro is a bassist who played the "Bass Heroes" show in Jakarta. Later, Indro often played with Tohpati in many different shows. With Simak Dialog, Tohpati had released 3 albums, which were Lukisan, Baur and Trance/Mission.

In the late 1990s, Tohpati decided to start a solo career and released his first solo album in 1998. The album was also includes a collaboration with Shakila and Glenn Fredly, both pop singers. To gain more popularity, he released two video clips of one of his songs on the album, the song titled "Lukisan Pagi", which was a song with a collaboration with Shakila. The video clip was a success and the song made it to the charts in Indonesia. 

His second album, Serampang Samba offered more instrumental hits. Quite different with the last album, Tohpati only included one song with vocals on the album, titled Jejak Langkah Yang Kau Tinggal. This was also the only song with a video clip. Serampang Samba also consists of more traditional Indonesian music with more acoustic guitars and Balinese elements. It can be said that this album is more idealist and progressive compared to his last album.

Since 2007, simakDialog signed to the New York-based progressive/fusion label Moonjune Records and released internationally three albums so far, namely Patahan (live), Demi Masa and The 6th Story. Tohpati also released two albums on Moonjune as a bandleader. Tohpati Ethnomission's Save The Planet is his yet further exploration of the experimental jazz fusion, while his power trio Tohpati Bertiga mixes that with a touch of progressive metal.

Equipment
Tohpati mainly uses his Fender Stratocaster for recording and live performances. However, he has changed the pickups of the guitar, which are Seymour Duncan and DiMarzio X2N. Other guitars that he uses are Sadowsky and Takamine. The guitars are connected to Rocktron effects then to a Mesa Boogie amplifier.

Discography
As a leader
 Tohpati (1998)
 Serampang Samba (2002)
 It's Time
 Song For You
 Tribal Dance (2014)
 Guitar Fantasy
With Tohpati Ethnomission
 Save The Planet (2010)
 Mata Hati (2017)
With simakDialog (sD)
 Lukisan
 Baur
 Trance/Mission (2002)
 Patahan (2007)
 Demi Masa (2009)
 The 6th Story (2013)
With Tohpati Bertiga
 Riot (2012)
 Faces (2017)

Sources

External links
Tohpati biography at Gitaris.com

Indonesian guitarists
Anugerah Musik Indonesia winners
1971 births
Living people
21st-century guitarists